Souskiou is a village in the Paphos District of Cyprus, located 4 km north of Kouklia. The village is famous throughout the Island of Cyprus for its annual cultural festival (dating from old times) called "To Panairi tis Souskious". Besides being the name of the festival, " To Panairi tis Souskious" is also a term used by a minority of the Cypriot population to describe a funny person, company or situation which is out of control.

References

Communities in Paphos District